William Frye (September 13, 1822–July 1, 1872) was a German-born American painter. His artwork can be seen at the Huntsville Museum of Art.

References

1822 births
1872 deaths
Artists from Wrocław
German emigrants to the United States
Painters from Alabama
American male painters
19th-century American painters
19th-century American male artists